The 19091 / 19092 Bandra Terminus - Gorakhpur Humsafar Express is a superfast train belonging to Western Railway zone that runs between Bandra Terminus and Gorakhpur Junction.

It is currently being operated with 19091/19092 train numbers on weekly basis.

Coach Composition 

The trains are completely 3-tier AC sleeper trains designed by Indian Railways with features of LED screen display to show information about stations, train speed etc. and will have announcement system as well, Vending machines for tea, coffee and milk, Bio toilets in compartments as well as CCTV cameras.

Service

The 19091/Bandra Terminus - Gorakhpur Humsafar Express has an average speed of 53 km/hr, and covers 1977 km in 37 hrs.

The 19092/Gorakhpur - Bandra Terminus Humsafar Express has an average speed of 56 km/hr, and covers 1977 km in 35 hrs.

Route & Halts 

The important halts of the train are :

Schedule

Rake Sharing

The train share its rake with 22923/22924 Bandra Terminus–Jamnagar Humsafar Express.

Traction

See also 

 Humsafar Express
 Bandra Terminus railway station
 Gorakhpur Junction railway station

Notes

References 

Humsafar Express trains
Rail transport in Uttar Pradesh
Rail transport in Madhya Pradesh
Rail transport in Gujarat
Rail transport in Maharashtra
Transport in Mumbai
Transport in Gorakhpur
Railway services introduced in 2021